R.,Udaygiri is a Tehsil and also a CD block in the Gajapati District of Odisha.It is located 61 k.m. from District Head Quarter i.e. Paralakhemundi

Geography
The village is located at geo-coordinates of latitude 20.27 and longitude 85.84.

Demographics
According to Census 2011 information the sub-district code of R Udaygiri block is 03102. There are about 292 villages in R Udaygiri block.

Economy
Most of the people from the village are dependent on farming and business for their livelihood.

Education
List of educational institutes in R.Udayagiri:
 Nodal U.P School
 Gopabandhu U.P School
 Govt. High School, R. Udayagiri
 Mahendrataneya Jr. college
 Arabindo School
 Saraswati Sishu Mandir

References

Villages in Gajapati district